Bartholomäus Scultetus (born Barthel Schulze; 14 May 1540, Görlitz – 21 June 1614, Görlitz) was a mayor of Görlitz, astronomer, cartographer and compiler of biblical chronologies. He knew Tycho Brahe and was visited by Johannes Kepler. He conferred with Rabbi Loew, the famous Prague Kabbalist.

1540 births
1614 deaths
People from Görlitz
16th-century German astronomers
German cartographers
16th-century cartographers
17th-century cartographers
16th-century German writers
16th-century German male writers
17th-century German writers
17th-century German male writers
17th-century German astronomers